St. Philip's Church may refer to:

Australia 
 St Philip's Church, Sydney
 Saint Philip Church, Culham Western Australia

Pakistan 
 St Philip's Church (Hyderabad)

United Kingdom 
 St Philip's Church, Alderley Edge, Cheshire
 St Philip's Church, Avondale Square, Camberwell, London
 St Philip's Church, Hassall Green, Cheshire
 St Philip's Church, Hove, East Sussex
 St Philip's Church, Kelsall, Cheshire
 St. Philip's Church, Pennyfoot Street, Nottingham
 St Philip's Church, Salford, Greater Manchester

United States 
 St. Philip Church (Norwalk, Connecticut)
 St. Philip AME Church, Savannah, Georgia, historic place in Chatham County, Georgia
 St. Philip's Church in the Highlands, Garrison, New York
 St. Philip's Church, Brunswick Town, North Carolina
 St. Philips Moravian Church, Winston-Salem, North Carolina
 St. Philip's Episcopal Church (disambiguation), multiple places

See also
 St. Philip's Episcopal Church (disambiguation)
 St. Philip Neri's Church (disambiguation)